Mir also spelled as Meer is a Kashmiri Muslim family name found in the Kashmir region of India and Pakistan. Mirs claim to be descendants of Sultan Shah Mir. The Mir surname, unlike many clans in the Kashmir valley is used exclusively by Muslims and not by Hindus.

Subcastes
Many sub castes and compounded surnames extend from this caste. The name Mir is also present in Azad Kashmir, specially in the Neelum Valley.

See also
Indian name
Kashmiri Muslims
Shah Mir
Islam in India
Islam in Kashmir
Mir clan, a Sistani family in Iran

References

Kashmiri-language surnames
Kashmiri tribes
Indian surnames